is a Japanese singer and photographer, as well as a former idol and child actress. She is best known as a former member of the all-girl musical group Momoiro Clover Z, in which her signature color was green.

Biography 
Ariyasu was born in Kyoto Prefecture and grew up in Saitama Prefecture. Since the age of one, she has started acting as a baby magazine model. She was later represented by talent agency Carotte C&T and appeared on television shows and in numerous commercials.

Starting in 2004, Ariyasu regularly appeared on the Fuji TV network's morning children's program Ponkikkids, where she acted as a member of a unit called Sister Rabbits. Around the same time, she joined EXPG, the boy-band Exile's dance and vocal school for kids. The school members performed as child dancers for Exile and also received acting lessons.

On November 1, 2008, Ariyasu moved from Carotte to the Stardust Promotion talent agency, and on February 2, 2009 was put into the agency's all-girl idol group Power Age. Power Age had been launched in 2005 with members of elementary to high-school age, but it was nearing the end of its existence when she joined. Three months later, in May, the band was disbanded. On July 26, 2009, Ariyasu was added as a sixth member to the idol group Momoiro Clover, which was about to release its first indies single.

On November 9, 2012, Ariyasu's video comment was projected at Hige Danshaku's live comedy show at Molière Theater in Shinjuku, Tokyo. During the performance, Louis Yamada LIII revealed that he was an avid fan of Ariyasu and had even named his recently born daughter  after her.

On January 1, 2013, it was announced that Ariyasu would refrain from singing and talking until the end of January. As it was explained, she was receiving treatment for her throat and needed to let her vocal cords rest. On February 7, it was announced that another full month, until the end of February, was needed to complete the treatment and therefore in the upcoming events and broadcasts, Ariyasu would communicate by means of writing and other members would take turns in performing her solo parts in songs.
 
Ariyasu attended the Faculty of Arts at Nihon University and graduated from Department of Photography in March 2017. She was awarded the special prize of the art department (first in the university's nearly 100 years history) and the photography department encouragement prize (only 4 out of 96 graduates of photography department). She was the only university graduate among the Momoiro Clover Z members.

On January 15, 2018, Ariyasu announced on her personal blog that she would graduate Momoiro Clover Z to live life without any schedules or plans. Her last performance as a member of Momoiro Clover Z took place on January 21, 2018.

After Momoiro Clover Z: solo career and marriage 
On January 15, 2019, exactly one year after her graduation announcement, Ariyasu announced her comeback as a performer while continuing her activities as a photographer. She would be represented by her own company, and announced two concerts in Tokyo and Osaka.

On February 6, 2019, Ariyasu announced that she is in a relationship with her therapist who she first met in 2016 and started dating in 2018. They got married on November 23. Ariyasu has stated that she intends to stay active in the entertainment industry.

Image 
Ariyasu's Momoiro Clover "image color" (i.e., the color she wore during public appearances and the light stick color of her fans) was green. At 148 cm (4′10″), she is the shortest member of the group. She characterizes herself as "baka" ("silly", "stupid"), saying that at school she cannot understand fundamental things or remember anything, but her co-members say she actually studies all the time, even backstage. Ariyasu explains that it is exactly because she is stupid that she has to study hard. Her favorite subjects are English, mathematics and Japanese.

Associated acts 
  (since 2004)
 Power Age (February 2 — May 30, 2009)
 Momoiro Clover Z (July 26, 2009 – January 21, 2018)

Mini-Album

Albums

Video albums

Bibliography

Appearances

Movies 
  (2004)
 Shirome (2010)
  (short, February 4, 2012)
  (5-episode straight-to-DVD omnibus film, 2012)
  (2015)

TV dramas 
  (1999, Yomiuri TV)
 Saturday Drama Special  (2001, NHK)
 Suntory Mystery Prize  (2001, TV Asahi)
 Monday Mystery Theater  (2001, TBS)
 Tuesday Suspense Theater  (2001, NTV)
 SMAP×SMAP special  (2002, Fuji TV)
  (Ep. 359, 2002, TV Asahi)
  (2005, NTV)
 Friday Entertainment  (2006, Fuji TV)
 Drama 30  (2006, MBS TV)

TV variety shows 
  (2001, NTV)
  (2004–2005, Fuji TV) — as Momoka from the band Sisters Rabbit
 Mecha-Mecha Iketeru!  (2007, Fuji TV) — as one of Exile's backup dancers

Music videos 
 Asuka Hayashi –  (2003)
 SMAP –  (2005)
 Exile –  (2008)
 Exile – "The Galaxy Express 999" (2008)

Sport 
 Wrestle Kingdom 10 in Tokyo Dome (2016)

Notes

References

External links 
 
 
 

Momoiro Clover Z members
1995 births
Living people
Japanese idols
Japanese women pop singers
Japanese child actresses
Actors from Saitama Prefecture
Stardust Promotion artists
Musicians from Saitama Prefecture
Nihon University alumni
21st-century Japanese singers
20th-century Japanese actresses
21st-century Japanese actresses
21st-century Japanese women singers